Saint Helens is an unincorporated community in Lee County, Kentucky, in the United States.  It lies along Route 52 east of the city of Beattyville, the county seat of Lee County.  Its elevation is 728 feet (222 m).  It has a post office with the ZIP code 41368. This post office preëmpted the naming of a community in Jefferson County as Saint Helens; instead, it had to adopt the name "Shively" after an early settler.

This Lee County community is also sometimes (unofficially) known as Three Forks.

See also
 Other places named Three Forks, Kentucky

References

Unincorporated communities in Lee County, Kentucky
Unincorporated communities in Kentucky